Casey Weston (born December 4, 1992) is a singer-songwriter. She was one of the top two finalists on Adam Levine's team on the first season of The Voice.  One of her recordings from "The Voice" made number 90 on the Billboard Hot 100.

Discography

Albums

Singles

References

External links
 Casey Weston Official Website
 Casey Weston Official Myspace Site
 Casey Weston Official YouTube Channel

1993 births
American women country singers
American country singer-songwriters
American child singers
Living people
21st-century American singers
Singer-songwriters from Florida
The Voice (franchise) contestants
People from Naples, Florida
21st-century American women singers
Country musicians from Florida